Matuszny is a Polish surname. Notable people with the surname include:

 Kamil Matuszny (born 1974), Czech-Polish footballer
 Kazimierz Matuszny (born 1960), Polish politician

Polish-language surnames